A 99 Flake, 99 or ninety-nine is an ice cream cone with a Cadbury Flake inserted in it. The term can also refer to the half-sized Cadbury-produced Flake bar, itself specially made for such ice cream cones, and to a wrapped ice cream cone product marketed by Cadbury.

Created at the Cadbury's factory in Birmingham, England, the flake was originally designed to be a cuboid and to fit into a wafer. By 1930, Cadbury's was selling half-length Flake "99s" specifically for serving in an ice cream cone.

'99' ice cream

A 99 Flake is an ice cream cone, usually made with soft serve ice cream, into which a Flake bar has been inserted.  The ice cream is usually vanilla flavoured. They are sold by ice cream vans and parlours. Variations include a 99 with two flakes – often referred to as a "double 99" or "bunny's ears" – and a 99 with strawberry or raspberry syrup on top, sometimes known as "monkey's blood".

Cadbury 99 Flake bar

The Flake chocolate bar manufactured and marketed by Cadbury was first developed in the UK in 1920. An employee of Cadbury's noted that when the excess chocolate from the moulds used to create other chocolate bars was drained off, it fell off in a stream and created folded chocolate with flaking properties.

The early "99 Flake" was a wafer "sandwich", not a flake bar inserted into a cone of ice cream. It consisted of a small chocolate flake inserted between two servings of ice cream and placed between two wafer biscuits.

In 1930, Cadbury started producing a smaller version of the standard Flake bar especially for use with ice cream cones. These were marketed under the name 99 Flake and sold loose in boxes rather than individually wrapped like the traditional Flake.

Name
The origins of the name are uncertain. One claim is that it was coined in Portobello, Scotland, where Stefano Arcari who had opened a shop in 1922 at 99 Portobello High Streetwould break a large "Flake" in half and stick it in an ice cream. The name derived from the shop's address. A Cadbury representative took the naming idea to his company. Another address-based claim for the "99" is made by the Dunkerleys in Gorton, Manchester, who operated a sweet shop at 99 Wellington Street.

Another naming possibility is that it was named by immigrant Italian ice-cream sellers, many of whom were from the mountainous areas in Veneto, especially in the Bellunes Alps, Trentino, and Friuli. The name was in honour of the final wave of Italian First World War conscripts, born in 1899 and referred to as "i Ragazzi del 99" ("the Boys of '99"). In Italy they were held in such high esteem that some streets were named in their honour. The chocolate flake may have reminded the ice cream sellers of the long dark feather cocked at an angle in the conscripts' Alpini Regiment hats.

The Cadbury website says that the reason behind the Flake being called a "99" has been "lost in the mists of time". However, the website also references an article from an old Cadbury works paper, which states that the name came from the guard of the Italian king, which consisted of 99 men and thus "anything really special or first class was known as 99."

References

External links
 BBC News story about origin of the name

Ice cream brands
British cuisine
Cadbury brands
Chocolate desserts
Mondelez International brands
Cuboids

fi:99 Flake